AS Temanava is a football (soccer) club in Ma'atea, Mo'orea, Tahiti. They currently play in the Ligue 2, the second-tier of Tahitian football, after spending several years at the local league of Moorea. They play home games at Stade de Maatea.

The club won the Tahiti Cup in 2006, been classified to 2007 OFC Champions League.It's also, so far the only club from Moorea to win a national football competition in the French Polynesia.

In the continental tournament, Temanava ended on the 2nd position on Group B, earning a draw with the runners-up on that edition, Ba F.C.

Current squad
Squad for the 2019–20 Ligue 2 Moorea

Staff

Achievements
Ligue 2 Moorea
Champions (3): 2009–10, 2015–16, 2019–20
Tahiti Cup 
Champions (1): 2006

Continental Record

Last seasons

References

Football clubs in French Polynesia
Football clubs in Mo'orea
Association football clubs established in 1962
1962 establishments in French Polynesia